HMCS Barrie was a  that served with the Royal Canadian Navy during the Second World War. She served primarily in the Battle of the Atlantic as a convoy escort. She was named for the city of Barrie, Ontario.

Background

Flower-class corvettes like Barrie serving with the Royal Canadian Navy during the Second World War were different from earlier and more traditional sail-driven corvettes.  The "corvette" designation was created by the French as a class of small warships; the Royal Navy borrowed the term for a period but discontinued its use in 1877. During the hurried preparations for war in the late 1930s, Winston Churchill reactivated the corvette class, needing a name for smaller ships used in an escort capacity, in this case based on a whaling ship design. The generic name "flower" was used to designate the class of these ships, which – in the Royal Navy – were named after flowering plants.

Corvettes commissioned by the Royal Canadian Navy during the Second World War were named after communities for the most part, to better represent the people who took part in building them. This idea was put forth by Admiral Percy W. Nelles. Sponsors were commonly associated with the community for which the ship was named. Royal Navy corvettes were designed as open sea escorts, while Canadian corvettes were developed for coastal auxiliary roles which was exemplified by their minesweeping gear. Eventually the Canadian corvettes would be modified to allow them to perform better on the open seas.

Construction
Ordered 1 February 1940 as part of the 1939–1940 Flower-class building program, Barrie was laid down by Collingwood Shipyards Ltd. at Collingwood, Ontario on 4 April of that year. She was launched on 23 November 1940 and commissioned on the 12 May 1941.

During her career Barrie had two significant refits. The first one began in September 1941 and which took two months to repair defects. The second one began in mid-March 1944 at Thompson Brothers in Liverpool, Nova Scotia where her fo'c'sle was extended.

War service
After commissioning Barrie was assigned to Sydney Force. On 3 September 1941 she departed to escort convoy SC 43 however she left the convoy early to head on to Belfast due to major defects. After completing repairs Barrie served as an ocean escort until May 1942.

In May 1942 she was assigned to the Western Local Escort Force (WLEF). She remained with the WLEF for the remainder of the war. In June 1943 she was assigned to escort group W-1. Barrie stayed with W-1 for much of the war except for a short period in 1944 where she was temporarily assigned to escort group W-8.

Post war service
Barrie was paid off on 26 June 1945 at Sorel, Quebec. She was sold to Argentine mercantile interests in 1947. She was renamed the Gasestado. In 1957 Gasestado was taken over by the Argentine Navy and renamed Capitán Cánepa. She was used as a survey vessel until being broken up in 1972.

References

Notes

Bibliography

External links

Flower-class corvettes of the Royal Canadian Navy
1940 ships
Auxiliary ships of the Argentine Navy
Research vessels of Argentina
Corvettes of the Cold War